Alessandro Carrozza (born 1 February 1982 in Gallipoli, Apulia) is an Italian footballer who plays as midfielder for Fiamma Jonica Gallipoli Calcio 1946.

Biography
Carrozza's footballing career began later on than usual.  He had aspirations of becoming a footballer when he was 18 years old, but instead he became a carpenter.  When watching a Serie C game on television one day, he didn't think his abilities were any inferior to what he was watching.  He joined his local team; the now defunct Gallipoli Calcio, playing in Italian football's eighth tier, working his way up through the leagues with various clubs.  His dream of becoming a Serie A player came true in January 2012 when he joined Atalanta on loan, aged 30.

On 2 July, he signed a contract with Verona.

References

External links
 Alessandro Carrozza Career Statistics at TuttoCalciatori.net
  Biography of Carrozza
 Alessandro Carrozza at Footballdatabase

1982 births
Living people
Italian footballers
A.S.D. Gallipoli Football 1909 players
Taranto F.C. 1927 players
Pisa S.C. players
S.S.D. Varese Calcio players
Hellas Verona F.C. players
Atalanta B.C. players
Spezia Calcio players
U.S. Lecce players
S.S. Juve Stabia players
Serie A players
Serie B players
Serie C players
Serie D players
Eccellenza players
People from Gallipoli, Apulia
Association football midfielders
Sportspeople from the Province of Lecce
21st-century Italian people